Reilly & Maloney is an American folk music duo that were formed in the 1970s, composed of Ginny Reilly and David Maloney. Based in Seattle and in the San Francisco Bay Area, they performed for two decades. They toured nationally, appearing with artists such as Judy Collins and Tom Paxton. Together they issued seven vinyl LPs, before breaking up in the late 1980s and each going on to solo careers. 
 
They began playing together again in the early 2000s, after a ten-year hiatus. 2016 was their "45th Anniversary Farewell Tour", ending on December 11 with a concert at the Tim Noah Thumbnail Theater in Snohomish, Washington.

Discography

Reilly & Maloney

Ginny Reilly

David Maloney

References

External links

American musical duos
Musical groups from Washington (state)